The Long Expedition was an 1819 attempt to take control of Spanish Texas by filibusters. It was led by James Long and successfully established a small independent government, known as the Republic of Texas (distinct from the later Republic of Texas created by the Texas Revolution).  The expedition crumbled later in the year, as Spanish troops drove the invaders out.  Long returned to Texas in 1820 and attempted to reestablish his control. In October 1821, Long was defeated by Spanish troops, captured and sent to Mexico City where he was killed by a guard.

Background
Beginning in 1810, Spanish territories in North and South America began to revolt. In particular, the Mexican War of Independence made it difficult for Spain to adequately protect its more remote territories such as Texas. Lured by the promise of free land and potential wealth, many men from the United States joined expeditions to try to take Texas from Spain.  The expeditions were largely planned in New Orleans and variously wished to establish an independent republic in Texas or assist the revolutionaries fighting within Mexico.  For the first nine years of the revolt, ownership of Texas was contested.  The United States claimed that the Louisiana Purchase included all of Texas, while Spain believed the boundary rested at the Red River, leaving Texas under Spanish control. The Texans later had a revolt which led to their independence.

Preparation
In early 1819, Spain and the United States signed the Adams–Onís Treaty, which established the boundary of the Louisiana Purchase at the Sabine River.  Many Americans were outraged that the United States had abandoned any claim to Texas. Rhetoric was especially high in Natchez, Mississippi.  James Long, a doctor, was one of the most vehement voices against the treaty.  Public sentiment in Natchez soon swung to military action to take back territory they were convinced belonged to them.  Men began to gather in Natchez for an invasion of Texas.  They soon elected Long as their leader, although his only prior military experience had been as a surgeon in the War of 1812.  The Natchez newspaper opined that "Never was [there] a more propitious moment for effecting their purpose."  By the end of June, Long had received pledges for over $500,000, and about 200 men, including James Bowie and Ben Milam, had gathered for the expedition.

1819 expedition
Eli Harris led 120 men across the Sabine River to Nacogdoches.  Long followed two weeks later with an additional 75 men.  On June 22, the combined force declared a new government, with Long as president and a 21-member Supreme Council.  The following day, they issued a declaration of independence, modeled on the United States Declaration of Independence.  The document cited several grievances, including "Spanish rapacity" and "odious tyranny" and promised religious freedom, freedom of the press, and free trade.  The council also allocated  of land to each member of the expedition, and authorized the sale of additional land to raise cash for the fledgling government.  Within a month, the expedition had grown to 300 members.

The new government established trading outposts near Anahuac along the Trinity River and the Brazos River.  They also began the first English-language newspaper ever published in Texas.  The Texas Republican lasted only one month, August 1819.

Long also contacted Jean Lafitte, who ran a large smuggling operation on Galveston Island.  His letter suggested that the new government establish an admiralty court at Galveston, and offered to appoint Lafitte governor of Galveston.  Unbeknownst to Long, Lafitte was actually a Spanish spy.  While making numerous promises–and excuses–to Long, Lafitte gathered information about the expedition and passed it on to Spanish authorities.  By July 16, the Spanish Consul in New Orleans had warned the viceroy in Mexico City that "I am fully persuaded that the present is the most serious expedition that has threatened the Kingdom".

With Lafitte's lack of assistance, the expedition soon ran low on provisions.  Long dispersed his men to forage for food.  Discipline began to break down, and many men, including Bowie, returned home.  In early October, Lafitte reached an agreement with Long to make Galveston an official port for the new country and name Lafitte governor.  Within weeks, 500 Spanish troops arrived in Texas and marched on Nacogdoches. Long and his men withdrew. Over 40 men were captured. Long escaped to Natchitoches, Louisiana.  Others fled to Galveston and settled along Bolivar Peninsula.

1821 expedition

Long joined the refugees at Bolivar Peninsula on April 6, 1820, with more reinforcements.  He continued to raise money to equip a second expedition.  Fifty men attempted to join him from the United States, but they were arrested by American authorities as they tried to cross into Texas.  The men who had joined Long were disappointed they were paid in scrip, and they gradually began to desert. By December 1820, Long commanded only 50 men.

With the aid of Ben Milam and others, Long revitalized the Supreme Council. He later broke with Milam, and the expedition led an uncertain existence until September 19, 1821, when Long and 52 men marched inland to capture Presidio La Bahía. The town fell easily on October 4, but four days later Long was forced to surrender by Spanish troops under the command of Lieutenant Colonel Ignacio Pérez. He was taken prisoner and sent to Mexico City, where about six months later he was shot and killed by a guard — reportedly bribed to do so by José Félix Trespalacios.

Footnotes

References
 originally published 2004 by New York: Free Press
 
 T. R. Fehrenbach. Lone Star A History of Texas and the Texans. Collier Books: New York 1980.

Texas border disputes
Spanish Texas
Conflicts in 1819
Conflicts in 1820
Wars involving Mexico
Former regions and territories of the United States